Kalkun Cay is a rocky, steep and narrow islet, located in the middle of the Savana Passage in the United States Virgin Islands. It is one mile northeast of Savana Island and one mile west of West Point on the island of Saint Thomas. Kalkun Cay is 73 feet high and covered with underbrush and grass. It is an important habitat of native seabirds.

References 

Islands of the United States Virgin Islands
West End, Saint Thomas, U.S. Virgin Islands